Hans and Sophie Scholl, often referred to in German as  (the Scholl siblings), were a brother and sister who were members of the White Rose, a student group in Munich that was active in the non-violent resistance movement in Nazi Germany, especially in distributing flyers against the war and the dictatorship of Adolf Hitler. In post-war Germany, Hans and Sophie Scholl are recognized as symbols of German resistance against the totalitarian Nazi regime.

Biography

There were six Scholl siblings: Inge (1917–1998), Hans (1918–1943), Elisabeth (1920–2020), Sophie (1921–1943), Werner (1922–1944) and Thilde (1925–1926), whose family lived in Württemberg, in the towns of Forchtenberg (until 1930), Ludwigsburg (1930–1932) and Ulm (1932–).

On February 18, 1943, two of the siblings, Hans and Sophie, were handing out flyers at the Ludwig Maximilian University of Munich, when they were caught by the custodian, Jakob Schmid, who informed the Gestapo. By February 22, 1943, they had been sentenced to death by the People's Court, led by Judge-President Roland Freisler and were executed by guillotine on the same day in the Stadelheim Prison. Their grave is in the adjacent Perlacher Forst cemetery (grave number 73-1-18/19).

Posthumous recognition 

The Geschwister-Scholl-Preis is a literary prize initiated by the State Association of Bavaria of the Börsenverein des Deutschen Buchhandels and the city of Munich. Since 1980, they have annually awarded this prize to the book which "shows intellectual independence and supports civil freedom, moral, intellectual and aesthetic courage and that gives an important impulse to the present awareness of responsibility" ("").

There are many memorial places for the Scholl siblings at the Ludwig Maximilian University in Munich. The new Geschwister-Scholl-Institut for political science, founded in the post-war era, was named after them on January 30, 1968. The area in front of the university's main building is named . The last flyer of the White Rose is set in the ground. Since 1997, a memorial to the Scholl siblings and other members of the White Rose can be found in the atrium of the main building, and since 2005, a bronze bust of Sophie Scholl. The Geschwister-Scholl-Preis is awarded annually in the auditorium of the university. However, a proposal by the student government to rename the university "Geschwister Scholl University" was rejected by the university's leadership.

Many cities in Germany have named streets, plazas and schools after the Scholl siblings.

It was, however, not until the 1998 law to abolish Nazi judgments of injustice in the administration of criminal justice that the sentences against Hans Scholl and other members of the White Rose became void in Germany.

References

 Der Prozess gegen Hans und Sophie Scholl "The trial against Hans and Sophie Scholl"

External links 
 Sophie Scholl in Ludwigsburg – about Sophie Scholl's childhood years in Ludwigsburg, Germany